Close Encounters of the Third Kind (Original Motion Picture Soundtrack) is the film score to the 1977 film of the same name, composed and conducted by John Williams. The soundtrack album was released on vinyl album (with a gatefold sleeve), 8-track tape and audio cassette by Arista Records in 1977, with a total running time of 41 minutes (it was later released on compact disc in 1990). The soundtrack album was a commercial success, peaking at #17 on the US Billboard album chart in February 1978 and was certified Gold by the RIAA for 500,000 copies shipped. It also peaked at #40 in the UK album charts.

Although not included on the original soundtrack album, a 7" single of a disco treatment of the five-note motif, titled, "Theme from Close Encounters of the Third Kind", was included with the album as a free bonus item. Despite being a giveaway, Billboard chart rules at that time allowed the single itself to chart, and it peaked at #13 on the US Billboard Hot 100 in March 1978. The single was later added as a bonus track to the cassette.

Following the twentieth anniversary re-release of the film in 1998, a new expanded soundtrack was released on compact disc by Arista. The "Collector's Edition Soundtrack" was made using 20-bit digital remastering from the original tapes, and contained 26 tracks totalling 77 minutes of music. The CD also came with extensive liner notes, including an interview with Williams. Cues were given new titles, and it also contained previously unreleased material, as well as material that was recorded but never used in the film. La-La Land Records reissued the soundtrack on November 28, 2017, in recognition of the film's fortieth anniversary.

The score features some of Williams' most complex and modernistic writing, making use of extended orchestral techniques and atonality.

Track listing

1977 original album

† 1978 reissue – bonus track (cassette), free bonus 7" single (vinyl album).

1998 Collector's Edition

2017 La-La Land Records' 40th Anniversary release

+ Contains "When You Wish Upon a Star" (interpolated), written by Ned Washington and Leigh Harline.

+ Contains "When You Wish Upon a Star" (interpolated), written by Ned Washington and Leigh Harline.
† Previously unreleased.
‡ Contains previously unreleased material.

Charts

References

1970s film soundtrack albums
1977 soundtrack albums
1998 soundtrack albums
Arista Records soundtracks
Grammy Award for Best Score Soundtrack for Visual Media
John Williams soundtracks
La-La Land Records soundtracks